Wardlow may refer to:
Wardlow, Alberta, a hamlet in Canada
Wardlow, Derbyshire, a parish and village in the Derbyshire Dales, England
Wardlow Quarry, a limestone quarry on the Weaver Hills, Staffordshire, England, UK
Wardlow station, a LACMTA train station in Long Beach, California, U.S.

Persons with the surname
Dennis Wardlow (born 1954), American politician from Florida; Prime Minister of the micronation Conch Republic
Gayle Dean Wardlow (born 1940), American historian of the blues
Lynn Wardlow (born 1943), American politician from Minnesota
Wardlow (wrestler),  mononymous ring name of American professional wrestler Michael Wardlow

See also
Wardlow Mires, a parish and village in the Derbyshire Dales, England
Illinois v. Wardlow, a 2000 U.S. Supreme Court case regarding searches and seizures
Wardlaw, a Scottish surname